This is a list of the 13 members of the European Parliament for Slovakia in the 2009 to 2014 session.

List

Party representation

Notes

2009
List
Slovakia